Ziauddin Barani (‎; 1285–1358 CE) was an Indian Muslim political thinker of the Delhi Sultanate located in present-day Northern India during Muhammad bin Tughlaq and Firuz Shah's reign. He was best known for composing the Tarikh-i-Firoz Shahi (also called Tarikh-i-Firuz Shahi), a work on medieval India, which covers the period from the reign of Ghiyath al-Din Tughluq to the first six years of reign of Firoz Shah Tughluq and the Fatwa-i-Jahandari which promoted a hierarchy among Muslim communities in the Indian subcontinent, although according to M. Athar Ali it was not based on race or even like the caste system, but taking as a model Sassanid Iran, which promoted an idea of aristocracy through birth and which was claimed by Persians to be "fully in accordance with the main thrust of Islamic thought as it had developed by that time", including in the works of his near-contemporary Ibn Khaldun.

Life
Barani was born in 1285, to an Indian Muslim family native to Baran, (now Bulandshahr) in northern India, hence his nisba Barani. His ancestors had immigrated to Baran from the Indian town of Kaithal, Haryana. His father, uncle, and grandfather all worked in high government posts under the Sultan of Delhi. His maternal grandfather Husam-ud-Din, was an important officer of Ghiyas ud din Balban and his father Muwayyid-ul-Mulk held the post of naib of Arkali Khan, the son of Jalaluddin Firuz Khalji. His uncle Qazi Ala-ul-Mulk was the Kotwal (police chief) of Delhi during the reign of Ala-ud-Din Khalji. Barani never held a post, but was a nadim (companion) of Muhammad bin Tughlaq for seventeen years. During this period he was very close to Amir Khusro. After Tughlaq was deposed, he fell out of favor. In "Exile" he wrote two pieces dealing with government, religion, and history, which he hoped would endear him to the new sultan, Firuz Shah Tughluq. He was not rewarded for his works and died poor in 1357.

His gravestone lies in the courtyard of Nizamuddin Auliya's dargah in Delhi, at the entrance of the dalan of Mirdha Ikram, and near the tomb of Amir Khusrau.

Works

Fatwa-i-Jahandari
The Fatwa-i-Jahandari is a work containing the political ideals to be pursued by a Muslim ruler in order to earn religious merit and the gratitude of his subjects. It is written as nasihat(advices) for the Muslim kings.

His fatwa would condone segregation of the Muslim ashraf upper castes and ajlaf low castes, in addition to the azral under-castes or the converted Muslims who are regarded as "ritually polluted" by the ashraf. Muzaffar Alam argues that, contrarily to what many think, through this aristocratic view of power he doesn't follow secular models (Iranian or Indian), "rather, the  interests  of  the  Muslim  community  define the contours  of  his  ideas  on the heredity question", as he saw that during times of political troubles "frequent changes within ruling classes lead to the ruination of illustrious Muslim families", and thus preserving these upper class families, themselves at such place for diverse administrative or military qualities, would lead to the advent of more capable rulers and in the longer run help Muslim interests, Alam to conclude that this hierarchization "was a conscious choice exercized by Barani to serve the narrowly sectarian interests of the early Islamic regime in India

The work delves into aspects of religion and government and the meeting of those two, as well as political philosophy. He notes:

Barani's Fatwa-i-Jahandari provides an example of his views on religion. He states that there is no difference between a Muslim king and a Hindu ruler, if the Muslim king is content in collecting jizya (poll-tax) and khiraj (tribute) from the Hindus. Instead, he recommends that a Muslim king should concentrate all his power on holy wars and completely uproot the "false creeds". According to him, a Muslim king could establish the supremacy of Islam in India only by slaughtering the Brahmins. He recommends that a Muslim king "should make a firm resolve to overpower, capture, enslave and degrade the infidels."

At the same time, the book makes it clear that the kings of the Delhi Sultanate did not hold similar views. Barani rues that they honoured and favoured the Hindus, and had granted them the status of dhimmis (protected persons). The Muslim kings appointed Hindus to high posts, including governorships. Barani further laments that the Muslim kings were pleased with the prosperity of Hindus in their capital Delhi, even when poor Muslims worked for them and begged at their doors.

Tarikh-i-Firuz Shahi
The Tarikh-i-Firuz Shahi or Tarikh-i-Firoz Shahi (Firuz Shah's History) (1357) was an interpretation of the history of the Delhi Sultanate up to the then-present Firuz Shah Tughlaq. Then interpretation noted that the sultans who followed the rules of Barani had succeeded in their endeavors while those that did not, or those who had sinned, met the Nemesis. 

But, though Barani refers many times to the sources of information, he did not consult his contemporary works. This resulted in the sketchy description of Ala-ud-Din Khalji’s wars in Chittor, Ranthambhor and Malwa and the Deccan campaigns of Malik Kafur. The later medieval historians, Nizam-ud-Din Ahmad, Badaoni, Ferishta and Haji-ud-Dabir depended upon the Tarikh-i-Firuz Shahi for their account of history of the period covered in this work. Abdul Haq Dehlvi in his Akhbar-ul-Akhyar depended upon the work for the biographical sketches of Nizam-ud-Din Auliya and the other Sufi saints.

Zawabit

Barani categorized the law into two kinds , the Shariat and the Zawabit. The Zawabit were the state laws formulated by the monarch  in consultation with the nobility in the changed circumstances to cater to the new requirements which the Shariat was unable to fulfill.

The Zawabit, he said must be in the spirit of the Shariat and enumerated four conditions for its formulation as guidelines. They are-

 The Zawabit should not negate the Shariat.
 It must increase the loyalty and hope among the nobles and common people towards the Sultan
 Its sources and inspiration should be the Shariat and pious Caliphs
 If at all it had to negate the Shariat out of exigencies, it must follow charities and compensation in lieu of that negation

Other works
 Salvat-i-Kabir (The Great Prayer)
 Sana-i-Muhammadi (Praises of Prophet Mohammad)
 Hasratnama (Book of Regrets)
 Tarikh-i-Barmaki
 Inayat Nama-i-Ilahi (Book of Gods Gifts)
 Maasìr Saadat (Good Deeds of the Sayyids)
 Lubbatul Tarikh.
Fatawa-i-Dindari

Work online

See also
Caste system among South Asian Muslims
List of Muslim historians

Notes

References
 
 
 
 

1285 births
1357 deaths
14th-century Indian historians
Chroniclers
Delhi Sultanate
Historians of India
Indian historians of Islam
Indian political philosophers
People from Bulandshahr
14th-century historians of the medieval Islamic world